The 85-mm divisional gun D-44 was a Soviet divisional 85-mm calibre field artillery gun used in the last action of World War II. It was designed as the replacement for the 76 mm divisional gun M1942 (ZiS-3). The gun is no longer in front-line service with the Russian Ground Forces, although some 200 of the Chinese Type 56 variant are still in service with the Pakistan Army. Wartime service included use by communist forces during the Vietnam War and by Arab forces during their conflicts with Israel.

Overview
The design of the D-44 started in 1943 at the design bureau of No.9 factory "Uralmash" and production began in 1944. Its GRAU code was 52-P-367. The SD-44 was a 1950s variant with an auxiliary propulsion unit and ammunition box for 10 rounds, with 697 issued to the airborne forces (VDV) from 1954. The D-44N was a 1960s variant with an APN 3-7 infra-red illumination device for night combat.  China received D-44s during the Korean War and began manufacturing a copy, the Type 56, in the early 1960s.  Finally, the Polish Army has equipped some of their D-44 guns with electrical subsystems in the early 1980s and designated them D-44M and D-44MN.

The barrel was developed from that of the T-34-85 tank and was capable of firing 20–25 high-explosive (HE), armor-piercing, and high-explosive antitank (HEAT) projectiles per minute.  Subcaliber BR-365P HVAP-T (high velocity armor-piercing-tracer) projectiles were capable of penetrating 100 mm of armor at 1000 meters at a ninety-degree obliquity, and the BR-367P HVAP-T projectile penetrates 180 mm of armor under the same conditions.  The post-war  round O-365K HE weighed 9.5 kg and packed 741 grams of TNT as its bursting charge, while the BK-2M HEAT-FS (fin-stabilized) projectile can penetrate 300 mm of armor.  The HEAT round for the Type 56 has a maximum range of 970 meters and will penetrate 100 mm of armor at an angle of 65 degrees.

The gun uses GAZ-AA tires, and is towed by a 2.5t truck or a Ya-12 tractor with the average speed of 20–25 km/h on surfaced roads, and 11 km/h over open terrain, with a maximum towing speed over asphalt roadway of about 55 km/h. The SD-44's auxiliary propulsion unit M-72 of 14 hp can move the gun at road speeds up to 25 km/h.

The gun uses the OP-2-7 sight with 5.5x magnification for day combat.  The sight permits target acquisition at 1500 meters.

Production
The D-44 was produced from 1945 until 1953.  During the years 1948-1950, over two thousand D-44s were produced per year. The D-44 also served as the basis from which the 85 mm antitank gun D-48 was developed and also the RPU-14 multiple rocket launcher uses the D-44's carriage.

Use by other nations

By the 1950s, the D-44 had been exported for use by Warsaw Pact nations, with the gun remaining in service with the East German National People's Army until the fall of the East Germany.  Besides Pakistan and East Germany, other users include(d) Albania, Algeria, Armenia, Azerbaijan, Bulgaria, Cambodia, China (Type 56), Cuba, Egypt, Georgia, Guinea, Guinea-Bissau, Hungary, Iran, Iraq, North Korea, Laos, Mali, Morocco, Mozambique, Poland, Romania, Somalia, Sri Lanka, Sudan, Syria, Vietnam and Zambia

Current Users
 - 80 in service.
 - 35 in service.
 - 100 in service.
 - 150 in storage.
 - Unknown number in service.
 - 10 Type 56 in service.
 - Unknown number in service.
Tigray Defense Forces
 - Unknown number of Type 56 service.
 - Unknown number in service.
 - 6 in service.
 - 8 in service.
 - Unknown number of D-44 and D-48 in service.
 - 12 Type 56 in service.
 - 200 in service.
 - Unknown number in service.
 - 75 Type 56 in service.
 Transnistria
 -  Unknown number in service.
 -  Unknown number in service.

 : 27 in service

Former Users

 - 1 captured in Syria.

 - Used during Vietnam War.
 - Used by Polish People's Army used during World War II and post war.

 - Retired and replaced by 122 mm Type 60 field guns
 - Status unknown.

See also
 85 mm vz. 52 - A similar Czech gun which used the same ammunition.

Citations

References
 Brassey's Encyclopedia of Land Forces and Warfare, Brassey's Inc., Washington D.C., 2000, .
 Die Landstreitkräfte der NVA, Wilfried Kopenhagen, Motorbuch Verlag, Stuttart, 2003, .
 German Artillery of World War Two, Ian V. Hogg, Greenhill Books, London, 2002. .
 Foss, Christopher F. (ed.) Jane's Armour and Artillery 1981-1982, Jane's Publishing Company Ltd, London & New York, 1982. 
 Foss, Christopher F. (ed.) Jane's Armour and Artillery 2007-2008, Jane's Publishing Company Ltd, Coulsdon, 2007. 
 Shunkov V. N. The Weapons of the Red Army, Mn. Harvest, 1999 (Шунков В. Н. - Оружие Красной Армии. — Мн.: Харвест, 1999.) .
 The American Arsenal, Ian V. Hogg (introduction), Greenhill Books, London, 2001. .
 TRADOC Worldwide Equipment Guide

External links

Ammunition data on BattleField.Ru 
Armor penetration table
More photos of the D-44 at Wikimedia Commons

85 mm artillery
Artillery of the Soviet Union
World War II field artillery
World War II anti-tank guns
World War II artillery of the Soviet Union
Anti-tank guns of the Soviet Union
Uralmash products
Weapons and ammunition introduced in 1944